Sybrida inordinata is a species of snout moth. It is found in Taiwan and India.

References

Moths described in 1865
Pyralinae